Charles King (November 9, 1912 – November 4, 1969) was an American Negro league pitcher in the 1930s.

A native of Roper, North Carolina, King played for the Pittsburgh Crawfords in 1937 and 1938, and also played for the Philadelphia Stars in 1938. He died in Plymouth, North Carolina in 1969 at age 56.

References

External links
 and Seamheads

1912 births
1969 deaths
Philadelphia Stars players
Pittsburgh Crawfords players
Baseball pitchers
Baseball players from North Carolina
People from Washington County, North Carolina
20th-century African-American sportspeople